Marc Andre Schmerböck (born 1 April 1994) is an Austrian professional footballer who plays as a midfielder.

Club career
On 5 January 2021, he joined TSV Hartberg on a two-and-a-half-year contract.

References

1994 births
People from Feldbach District
Footballers from Styria
Living people
Austrian footballers
Austria youth international footballers
Austria under-21 international footballers
Association football midfielders
SK Sturm Graz players
Wolfsberger AC players
TSV Hartberg players
Austrian Football Bundesliga players